The Bernhardt Line (or Reinhard Line) was a German defensive line in Italy during the Italian Campaign of World War II. Having reached the Bernhardt Line at the start of December 1943, it took until mid-January 1944 for the U.S. Fifth Army to fight their way to the next line of defences, the Gustav Line. The line was defended by XIV Panzer Corps (XIV Panzerkorps), part of the German Tenth Army (10. Armee).

Unlike most of the other defensive lines it did not run all the way across Italy but was merely a bulge in front of the main Gustav Line, running over the massif of Monte Cassino, enclosing the peaks of Monte Cassino (Monastery Hill), Monte la Difensa, Monte la Remetanea and Monte Maggiore, in the territory of Rocca d'Evandro, and Monte Sambucaro (or Sammucro), which stands at the border of the three regions (Lazio, Molise and Campania). However, the defences of the Gustav Line on the Adriatic are sometimes referred to as the Bernhardt Line and the battles for this part of the line are included in this entry.

The Bernhardt line was not as strong as the Gustav Line and was intended only to delay the Allies' arrival at the Gustav Line. Together with the Gustav Line and the Hitler Line, it made up the German Winter Line defences.

Background
Following the Allied invasion of Italy in September 1943, the Italian government had surrendered, but the German Army continued to fight. The Allied 15th Army Group, commanded by General Sir Harold Alexander, in conquering the southern part of Italy but by early October had come up against the Volturno Line, the first of two lines (the next being the Barbara Line) used to delay the Allied advance to buy time to prepare the most formidable defensive positions which formed the Winter Line. Alexander had three possible alternatives to reach the Italian capital of Rome. On the Adriatic front he could advance to Pescara and then use Route 5 (the old Roman Via Valeria) which traversed the country to Rome on the other coast. Alternatively, on the other side of the Apennines, highway 7 (the old Roman Appian Way) followed along the west coast but south of Rome ran into the Pontine Marshes which the Germans had flooded. Finally, highway 6 ran in the same direction, but further inland, through the Liri valley.

Order of battle
The German forces in Italy were commanded by Field Marshal (Generalfeldmarschall) Albert Kesselring. The defence of the Winter Line was the task of the German 10th Army (10. Armee) under the temporary command of Lieutenant-General (General der Panzertruppe) Joachim Lemelsen (in the absence of General (Generaloberst) Heinrich von Vietinghoff, who was in Germany on sick leave). The German 10th Army had Traugott Herr's LXXVI Panzer Corps (LXXVI Panzerkorps) deployed on the eastern side of Italy, from the Apennine Mountains to the Adriatic, and Frido von Senger und Etterlin's XIV Panzer Corps (XIV Panzerkorps) on the western side, from the mountains to the Tyrrhenian sea.

The new Supreme Allied Commander of the Mediterranean Theater of Operations (MTO) was General Sir Henry Maitland Wilson, replacing General Dwight D. Eisenhower who had moved to command of the Allied forces preparing for Operation Overlord, the Allied invasion of Normandy. The Allied Armies in Italy (AAI), formerly designated the 15th Army Group, were commanded by General Alexander. Under his command were two field armies: to the left, on the western side of Italy, was the U.S. Fifth Army, commanded by Lieutenant General Mark W. Clark, and to the right, on the eastern side, was the British Eighth Army, commanded by General Sir Bernard Montgomery. The Fifth Army consisted of American, British and French units. The Eighth Army, with British, Indian, New Zealand, Canadian and Polish units, was from early January 1944 commanded by Lieutenant-General Sir Oliver Leese after General Montgomery was, along with General Eisenhower, also recalled to England to prepare for Operation Overlord.

Eighth Army on the Adriatic Winter Line defences

Prelude
On 3 October, a battalion of the British Eighth Army's 78th Infantry Division had crossed the Biferno river to confront the German Volturno-Viktor Line defences. Two Commando battalions landed from the sea north of the river at Termoli, and a fiercely contested battle ensued which had hung in the balance when a ford became unusable after heavy rains and prevented Allied armour from moving forward. However, the British infantry — reinforced from the sea by two brigades — had held out long enough against the tanks of 16th Panzer Division (16. Panzerdivision) for a Bailey bridge to be laid across the river, and the crisis passed with the arrival of elements of 1st Canadian Armoured Brigades. By 6 October, the Germans were withdrawing to new defensive positions behind the Trigno river, the "Barbara Line".

Port and transport capacity had also been affected by the logistic requirements of the Allied air force, which was establishing strategic bomber bases around Foggia.

The Eighth Army attacked across the Trigno on 2 November. By the next day, the German position had been turned and the Germans commenced a fighting withdrawal to the forward Winter-Line positions they were preparing on the ridges behind the Sangro River.

Advance across the Sangro

The Eighth Army's forward units had reached the Sangro on 9 November. Alexander had planned for Montgomery to strike across the river on its coastal plain on 20 November with the V Corps (Indian 8th Infantry and 78th Infantry Divisions). In secrecy, Montgomery shifted the Indian division to the right to narrow the V Corps front and concentrate its power, bringing the newly arrived 2nd New Zealand Division into the gap. Eighth Army also devised a deception scheme involving false troop movements and ammunition dumps to give the impression that the main attack would be through the British XIII Corps front.

However, Kesselring divined the Allies' intentions; on 18 November, Lemelsen had signaled Kesselring to the effect that the Allied concentrations on the coast led him to expect the main attack on his left wing. Then heavy rain raised the river levels forcing the postponement of the offensive to the night of 27 November and giving the Germans time to switch two divisions across the Apennines to the defending LXXVI Panzer Corps. This made three divisions on the coastal plain opposing V Corps: 65th Infantry Division (65. Infantriedivision), 90th Panzergrenadier Division (90. Panzergrenadierdivision) and 26th Panzer Division (26. Panzerdivision). 16th Panzer Division opposed the New Zealanders and the German 1st Parachute Division (1. Fallschirmjägerdivision) faced XIII Corps (1st Canadian Division and British 5th Infantry Division).

In the early hours of 28 November, the Eighth Army attack went in supported by heavy artillery concentrations. The New Zealanders advanced steadily; although the German defences had been well prepared most of the New Zealanders' objectives were manned by 65th Division which was poorly equipped and untried in battle. The German Division was also hampered by the fact that their commander—Brigadier-General (Generalmajor) G.H. von Ziehlberg—was severely wounded on the afternoon of 28 November. The 8th Indian Division, however, like the New Zealanders facing their first major combat action since arriving in Italy, experienced tougher opposition. Elements of 65th Infantry Division supported by an armoured battle group held tenaciously on to Mezzagrogna and the town was eventually taken on 29 November after tough, often hand to hand, fighting. On the morning of 29 November, 78th Infantry Division had joined the attack on the right of the Indian Division and had forced their way to Santa Maria by the evening, creating a base for their main attack the following day towards Fossacesia. By late on 30 November, 78th Division—supported by 4th Armoured Brigade—had taken Fossacesia, and the whole ridge on the far bank of the Sangro—carrying the main Bernhardt defences—was under Eighth Army control.

As the Eighth Army pushed forward over the next few days, 65th Infantry Division crumbled (to the extent that German 10th Army were later to order a court-martial into its conduct). However, Herr was able to introduce 90th Panzergrenadier Division into the line from his reserve and transferred reinforcements from the quieter sector inland in the form of elements of 1st Parachute Division. The complications of these manoeuvres introduced considerable confusion within the German alignment but they were nevertheless able to manage a fighting withdrawal to the ridge on the far side of the Moro river. Unaware of the disorganisation in the German ranks, the New Zealanders failed on 2 December to exploit an opportunity to capture Orsogna, a key position near the headwaters of the Moro, which on that day was still only lightly held. It was only on the morning of 3 December that the New Zealand Division disputed possession of Orsogna, but 26th Panzer had had just enough breathing space to organise and were able to repel them. The 26th Panzer then proceeded to create a formidable defensive complex around the town and along the ridge towards Ortona on the coast and Orsogna was not occupied by the Allies—despite a further two determined attempts during December—until the Germans withdrew after the Allied breakthrough at Cassino in May 1944.

Moro offensive

Montgomery now rested the tired 78th Division (which had been leading the V Corps advance since the Volturno Line offensive), swapping with the 1st Canadian Infantry Division from the relatively quiet XIII Corps sector. The Canadians, with the 8th Indian Infantry Division on their left, led the main thrust across the Moro on 8 December aiming for Ortona. By 20 December, after a stubborn resistance, first from elements of the German 90th Panzergrenadier Division and then elements of the 1st Parachute Division (which had relieved the panzergrenadiers), they had patrols on the outerskirts of the town. But the battle for Ortona took another week of fierce house to house fighting as the German 3rd Parachute Regiment tenaciously held on before withdrawing to the other side of the Riccio river on 28 December.

Meanwhile, inland V Corps, Orsogna had suffered three successive assaults but XIII Corps spearheaded by the 2nd New Zealand Division could not get past the defending 26th Panzer Division. After advancing a total of only 18 miles (29 km) and sustaining 6,500 casualties, blizzards, drifting snow and zero visibility at the end of December in jagged terrain caused Eighth Army's offensive on the Adriatic front to grind to a halt. As the New Year approached, it became clear that with no prospect of better weather until the spring, the Eighth Army did not have the strength to force its way to Pescara. Alexander called a halt to the offensive, instructing Montgomery to maintain sufficient activity to pin LXXVI Panzer Corps and prevent troops from being sent across to reinforce XIV Corps facing the Fifth Army.

The rest of the winter on the Adriatic front was spent in bitterly uncomfortable conditions with the opposing sides often in close proximity and engaged in night-time patrolling and vicious skirmishing.

Fifth Army Bernhardt Line offensive
It had taken Lieutenant General Mark Clark's Fifth Army, in deteriorating weather as the torrential autumn rains broke, from the middle of October to early November to fight their way across difficult terrain and through skillful and determined rearguard defences from the Volturno Line positions to the Bernhardt Line.

In the centre of the Fifth Army front lay the Mignano Gap, which, because of the marshy conditions on the coastal plain, represented the only realistic path to the mouth of the Liri valley, the route to Rome.

Flanking and overlooking Route 6 through the Mignano Gap and its villages (San Pietro Infine, San Vittore Del Lazio and Cervaro) are, successively Monte Camino, Monte Lungo, Monte Porchia and Monte Trocchio on the left and Monte San Croce, Monte Corno, Monte Sambúcaro and Monte Maio on the right. Monte Sambúcaro normally appears as Monte Sammucro on Allied maps of the time. On reaching the Bernhardt positions, an immediate attack was launched by the 201st Guards Brigade, which was attached to the 56th (London) Infantry Division, part of Lieutenant-General Sir Richard McCreery's British X Corps on Monte Camino on 6 November, which was beaten back by the 15th Panzergrenadier Division (15. Panzergrenadierdivision), with some 600 losses to the 201st Guards Brigade. By mid-November, it was clear that, after having sustained 10,000 combat casualties, since the Volturno Line offensive, the Fifth Army needed to pause, reorganise and re-gather its strength.

The Fifth Army resumed its attack on 1 December. The first attack—Operation Raincoat—was delivered, after an intensive artillery and air bombardment, by the British X Corps on the left (comprising the 46th and 56th Infantry Divisions) and elements of the U.S. II Corps, commanded by Major General Geoffrey Keyes, including the 1st Special Service Force, under Lieutenant Colonel Robert T. Frederick, on the right against the formidable Camino hill mass. The dominating peak on Monte Camino, Hill 963, is crowned by a monastery. At the upper end of the Camino feature are the numerous peaks of Monte Maggiore. On the east and northeast the slopes rise steeply to the heights, then fall away gradually to the west toward the Garigliano river. It took until 9 December before the Camino mass was secured from the 15th Panzergrenadier Division.

Meanwhile, on the Fifth Army's right flank, the U.S. VI Corps, commanded by Major General John P. Lucas and composed of the 34th and 45th Infantry Divisions, had attacked into the mountains but made little progress until reinforced by the mountain troops of the French Expeditionary Corps (CEF), recently arrived in Italy; they attacked again on 15 December.

On 8 December the U.S. 3rd and 36th Infantry Divisions and 1st Special Service Force of II Corps launched the attack on Monte Sambúcaro and into the Mignano Gap. By the night of 10 December, the peaks were taken, threatening the German positions in the gap. However, the German positions at San Pietro in the valley held firm until 16 December, when an attack launched from the Camino mass took Monte Lungo. The Germans could no longer expect to hold San Pietro when the dominating ground on both flanks, Monte Lungo and the Sambúcaro peaks, was in II Corps' possession. Several attacks were made in the next few days, and Morello Hill—overlooking the San Vittore positions from the north—was captured on 26 December.

On the U.S. VI Corps front, progress was made but proved very difficult over the mountainous terrain as the weather deteriorated further with the onset of winter. During the month of December, the Fifth Army suffered 5,020 wounded but total admissions to hospital totaled 22,816 with jaundice, fevers and trench foot prevalent.

At the end of December, the Fifth Army had to pause once again to reorganise, replace its losses and gather itself for a final push to reach the Gustav Line defences. The U.S. VI Corps was taken into reserve to train and prepare for the Anzio landings (codenamed Operation Shingle) with the French troops, by this time at corps strength, taking over their front.

The II Corps returned to the attack on 4 January 1944, with attacks parallel to Route 6 north and south of it. The northern attack took San Vittore, and by 7 January the overlooking height of La Chiaia. On the south side, the attack was made from Monte Lungo and captured Monte Porchia. Meanwhile, on their left, the British X Corps had attacked from positions on the Camino mass to take on 8 January the Cedro hill which with Monte Chiaia and Monte Porchia had formed a strong defensive line in front of Monte Trocchio.

The last offensive to clear the enemy in front of the Gustav defences started on 10 January. Cervaro was taken on 12 January and the overlooking hills to the north on 13 January. This opened up the northern flank of Monte Trocchio, and a heavy assault was planned for 15 January. However, the German XIV Panzer Corps considered the position to be untenable and withdrew across the Rapido. When the II Corps moved forward on 15 January, they encountered no resistance.

Aftermath
It had taken the U.S. Fifth Army six weeks of intense combat and 16,000 casualties to advance the 7 miles (11 km) through the Bernhardt Line defences, including the action at San Pietro Infine, to take Monte Trocchio and to reach the positions facing the main Gustav defences on 15 January.

See also
 Allied invasion of Italy
 Battle of San Pietro Infine
 Gustav Line
 U.S. Fifth Army
 Barbara Line
 U.S. 36th Infantry Division

Notes

Footnotes

Citations

References

External links
 Map of the German defensive lines

Conflicts in 1943
Conflicts in 1944
1943 in Italy
1944 in Italy
Battles of World War II involving Canada
Battles of World War II involving the United Kingdom
Italian campaign (World War II)
German World War II defensive lines
World War II sites in Italy
World War II operations and battles of the Italian Campaign
Battles of World War II involving New Zealand